Reckless Ranger is a 1937 American Western film directed by Spencer Gordon Bennet and written by Nate Gatzert. The film stars Robert Allen, Louise Small, Mary MacLaren, Harry Woods, Jack Perrin and Buddy Cox. The film was released on May 30, 1937, by Columbia Pictures.

Plot

Cast          
Robert Allen as Jim Allen / Bob Allen 
Louise Small as Mildred Newton
Mary MacLaren as Mary Allen
Harry Woods as Barlowe
Jack Perrin as Chet Newton
Buddy Cox as Jimmie Allen
Jack Rockwell as Mort
Slim Whitaker as Steve 
Roger Williams as Snager

References

External links
 

1937 films
1930s English-language films
American Western (genre) films
1937 Western (genre) films
Columbia Pictures films
Films directed by Spencer Gordon Bennet
American black-and-white films
1930s American films